Coro Gulf is located near Coro, a city in Falcón State of Venezuela. This gulf is located south of the Paraguaná Peninsula, one of the largest peninsulas in Venezuela by size.

External links
 http://wikimapia.org/2412429/Coro-Gulf

Gulfs of Venezuela
Geography of Falcón